Eel River is an unincorporated community in northern Harrison Township, Clay County, Indiana. It is part of the Terre Haute Metropolitan Statistical Area.

History
The Eel River, from which this community takes its name, was so named from a Native American word meaning "slippery fish".

Geography

References

Unincorporated communities in Clay County, Indiana
Unincorporated communities in Indiana
Terre Haute metropolitan area